The California Heatwave was a professional basketball team in the American Basketball Association (ABA) team based in Madera, California. The team began play in the fall of 2003 at Selland Arena in Fresno, California. The founder of the Fresno Heatwave was Albert Ellis and Richard Hanna. The Fresno Heatwave was coached by Sean Higgins, and its vice president was Janine Nkosi.

Originally, the team was called the Fresno Heat, but it was renamed Fresno Heatwave to avoid brand confusion with the National Basketball Association's Miami Heat.

History
On December 3, 2006, the team officially moved to Sacramento, California and became the Sacramento Heatwave. They played at Natomas H.S. Event Center before settling at Cosumnes River College.

They team moved to play at Folsom High School northeast of Sacramento before settling at West Campus High School in Sacramento.

On October 28, 2013, the Heatwave moved to Madera, California (25 miles northwest of Fresno) and changed its name to the California Heatwave.

In November 2014 team owner Reggie Davis announced that the Heatwave was ceasing operations immediately.

References

External links
 Official Site
 ABA Site

Defunct American Basketball Association (2000–present) teams
Basketball teams in Sacramento, California
Basketball teams established in 2003
2003 establishments in California
2014 disestablishments in California
Sports clubs disestablished in 2004
Madera, California
Sports in Fresno, California